is a town located in Inabe District, Mie Prefecture, Japan. , the town had an estimated population of 25,887 in 10027 households and a population density of 1100 persons per km².

Geography
Tōin is located near the far northeastern tip of the Kii Peninsula. The Inabe River flows eastward in the center of the town, and as it goes to the north it forms a gentle hill with an elevation of about 100 meters. The city with an administrative area is approximately five kilometers east-west by 7.3 kilometers north-south.

Neighboring municipalities
Mie Prefecture
Kuwana
Yokkaichi
Inabe

Climate
Tōin has a Humid subtropical climate (Köppen Cfa) characterized by warm summers and cool winters with light to no snowfall.

Demographics
Per Japanese census data, the population of Tōin has remained steady over the past 40 years.

History
The area of Tōin is part of ancient Ise Province and was largely administered by Kuwana Domain during the Edo period. With the creation of the modern municipalities system on April 1, 1889, the villages of Daicho, Inabe and Kanda were established within Inabe District, Mie. These villages merged to form the village of Tōin on November 3, 1954. Tōin was elevated to town status on April 1, 1967.

Government
Tōin has a mayor-council form of government with a directly elected mayor and a unicameral town council of 14 members. Tōin, collectively with the city of Inabe,  contributes two members to the Mie Prefectural Assembly. In terms of national politics, the town is part of Mie 4rd

Education
Tōin has six public elementary schools and two public middle schools operated by the town government. The town does not have a high school.

Transportation

Railway
 Sangi Railway – Hokusei Line
 –

Highway

Notable people
Matsumoto Kōshirō VII, kabuki actor
Tomoki Hoshino, professional baseball player

References

External links

Tōin official website 

Towns in Mie Prefecture
Tōin, Mie